Hanna City is a village in Peoria County, Illinois, United States. The population was 1,225 at the 2010 census. Hanna City is part of the Peoria, Illinois Metropolitan Statistical Area.

Hanna City was founded in 1882 and named after William Hanna (born 1827), who was president of the Peoria-Farmington Railroad, which ran through Hanna City. While originally a farming community, coal was soon discovered under the town.   The coal mine was a major factor in the early years of the town and kept it thriving for more than half a century. The main coal mine shaft was near the intersection of Second St and the railroad.

Geography

Demographics

As of the census of 2000, there were 1,013 people, 398 households, and 300 families residing in the village. The racial makeup of the village was 97.24% White, 0.39% African American, 0.20% Native American, 1.18% Asian, 0.69% from other races, and 0.30% from two or more races. Hispanic or Latino of any race were 1.09% of the population.

There were 398 households, out of which 32.9% had children under the age of 18 living with them, 64.1% were married couples living together, 8.3% had a female householder with no husband present, and 24.4% were non-families. 21.1% of all households were made up of individuals, and 10.1% had someone living alone who was 65 years of age or older. The average household size was 2.51 and the average family size was 2.90.

In the village, the population was spread out, with 25.8% under the age of 18, 6.9% from 18 to 24, 29.4% from 25 to 44, 22.5% from 45 to 64, and 15.4% who were 65 years of age or older. The median age was 37 years. For every 100 females, there were 96.7 males. For every 100 females age 18 and over, there were 91.8 males.

The median income for a household in the village was $42,639, and the median income for a family was $50,938. Males had a median income of $36,438 versus $26,397 for females. The per capita income for the village was $20,710. About 7.6% of families and 7.2% of the population were below the poverty line, including 12.1% of those under age 18 and 11.4% of those age 65 or over.

References

Villages in Peoria County, Illinois
Villages in Illinois
Peoria metropolitan area, Illinois
1882 establishments in Illinois
Populated places established in 1882